Raúl Cabanas (born 31 March 1986) is a Swiss footballer of Galician origin who currently plays as midfielder for FC Wohlen in the Swiss Challenge League. He is the cousin of 2006 FIFA World Cup, UEFA Euro 2004 and UEFA Euro 2008 Participant Ricardo Cabanas.

Cabanas signed a youth contract with Grasshopper-Club Zurich on 20 July 1997.

External links

football.ch profile 
FDB Profile

1986 births
Living people
Footballers from Zürich
Swiss Super League players
Swiss men's footballers
Grasshopper Club Zürich players
FC Wohlen players
Swiss people of Galician descent
Swiss people of Spanish descent
SC Young Fellows Juventus players
Association football midfielders